Rümelin, Ruemelin or Rumelin is a German surname. Notable people with the surname include:
Gustav Rümelin (1815–1889), German statistician, pedagogue and author
Julian Nida-Rümelin (born 1954), German philosopher and public intellectual
Martine Nida-Rümelin (born 1957), German philosopher
Surnames of German origin

German-language surnames